This season the league was split into additional two tiers Group G and Group D. The Group D had also two subgroup. Next season all of those tiers and extra subgroups will be combined into the single All-Soviet Super League.

League standings

Group G

The highest scoring games were between Burevestnik Moscow and Stal Dnipropetrovsk ending in 9:0, Traktor Stalingrad - Torpedo Gorky 7:2, and Frunze Plant - Torpedo Gorky 6:3.

Group D

Group D (cities of the East)

See also
 1937 Soviet Top League
 1937 Soviet First League
 1937 Soviet Second League

External links
 Group G, D, cities of the East. RSSSF

1937
4
Soviet
Soviet